The Neurotic Personality Questionnaire KON-2006 is a psychometric tool used for diagnosing personality dysfunctions  that contribute to the development of neurotic disorders. The use of the questionnaire may facilitate the diagnosis of neurotic disorder, as well as make it easier to differentiate between neurotic and pseudoneurotic syndromes, e.g. reaction to stress. Moreover, the questionnaire enables evaluation of changes occurring in the course of treatment.

The questionnaire has been created by Jerzy W. Aleksandrowicz, Katarzyna Klasa, Jerzy A. Sobański and Dorota Stolarska in the Department of Psychotherapy of the Jagiellonian University Medical College in Kraków, Poland.

The content of the questionnaire 
The questionnaire consists of 243 items that require positive or negative answer. They determine the values of 24 scales that describe areas related to the development of neurotic disorders, as well as the value of X-KON index that describes the global intensity of neurotic personality. Currently, only the Polish and Ukrainian versions of KON-2006 are available, however a number of studies based on the tool has been published in English.

Scales 
The following working (approximate) names were given to KON-2006 scales: 
 Feeling of being dependent on the environment 
 Asthenia 
 Negative self-esteem
 Impulsiveness
 Difficulties with decision making
 Sense of alienation
 Demobilization
 Tendency to take risks
 Difficulties in emotional relations
 Lack of vitality
 Conviction of own resourcelessness in life
 Sense of lack of control
 Deficit in internal locus of control
 Imagination. indulging in fiction
 Sense of guilt
 Difficulties in interpersonal relations
 Envy
 Narcissistic attitude
 Sense of being in danger
 Exaltation
 Irrationality
 Meticulousness
 Ponderings
 Sense of being overloaded

Methodology of the questionnaire creation 
Search for and selection of items that were used for the creation of the KON-2006 questionnaire were based on empirical methods. Analysis of usefulness of 779 items was conducted (including items drawn from scales belonging to various personality and temperament inventories e.g. 16PF, MMPI, PTS, TTS, IPIP, TCI). Clarity, explicitness and comprehensiveness of each item was evaluated and appropriate improvements were implemented. Next, a comparison of answers was made between healthy individuals and the patients that were beginning treatment due to neurotic disorders. This allowed to select 243 items most useful in differentiation of the patients with neurotic disorders from the healthy individuals. These items were used for the creation of Neurotic Personality Questionnaire. The construction of 24 scales was based on cluster analysis conducted on the population of patients at the beginning of treatment and control groups.

See also 
 Neuroticism
 Personality
 Symptom Checklist "O"

References 

Personality disorders screening and assessment tools